Simonet Creek is a river which flows through the Abel Tasman National Park in the north of the South Island of New Zealand.

References

Rivers of the Tasman District
Rivers of New Zealand